The Teeth of the Tiger is a 1919 American silent comedy film directed by Chester Withey and written by Roy Somerville based upon a novel of the same name by Maurice Leblanc. The film stars David Powell, Marguerite Courtot, Templar Saxe, Myrtle Stedman, Joseph Herbert, Charles L. MacDonald, and Riley Hatch. The film was released on November 2, 1919, by Paramount Pictures.

The film is now lost.

Plot

Living quietly under the assumed name Paul Sernine, reformed gentleman crook Arsene Lupin is summoned to protect his invalid, wealthy friend Henry Forbes. Despite the watchfulness of Paul and Alexandre Mazeroux, a fellow criminal turned detective, Forbes is murdered. French detective Jabot and the New York detective force have many suspects including Paul, Marie Forbes, the dead man's widow who is suspected on the basis of an apple found with an imprint of her teeth on it, Gordon Savage, her lover, and Florence Chandler, Forbes' secretary and beneficiary under his will. After a series of traps, false arrests, chases through secret passageways, and an escape from handcuffs, Paul deduces that the true criminal is Doctor Varney, who cared for Forbes. Paul prevents Varney from blowing up the house, and at the same time wins the affections of Florence.

Cast
David Powell as Paul Sernine / Arsène Lupin
Marguerite Courtot as Florence Chandler
Templar Saxe as Antoine Jabot
Myrtle Stedman as Marie Forbes
Joseph Herbert as Henry Forbes
Charles L. MacDonald as Chief Harvey Williams
Riley Hatch as Alexandre Mazeroux
Charles K. Gerrard as Gordon Savage
Frederick Burton as Doctor Varney

Production
Anna Lehr was to play the role of Florence Chandler but was replaced by Courtot during production after she became ill.<ref>Progressive Silent Film List: The Teeth of the Tiger] at silentera.com</ref>

 References 

 External links 

 
 Leblanc, Maurice, [https://archive.org/details/teethoftiger00lebliala The Teeth of the Tiger'', New York: Grosset & Dunlap, 1919 photo-play edition

1919 films
1910s English-language films
Silent American comedy films
1919 comedy films
Paramount Pictures films
Films directed by Chester Withey
American black-and-white films
Lost American films
American silent feature films
1919 lost films
Lost comedy films
Arsène Lupin films
1910s American films
Silent adventure films